Rudaki was a Persian poet.

Rudaki may also refer to:

Places 
 Rudaki, Iran, is a village in Iran
 Rudaki, Tajikistan, is a town in Tajikistan
 Rudaki, Podlaskie Voivodeship, is a village in Poland
 Rudaki District, is a district in the Region of Republican Subordination in Tajikistan

Other uses
 Rudaki (crater), a crater on Mercury

See also 
 Rudak (disambiguation)
 Rudki (disambiguation)